Movement for Peace is a British organisation.

It may also refer to:
 a peace movement
 Movement for Peace with Justice and Dignity, a Mexican movement protesting the Mexican drug war
 Movement for Peace and Socialism, an Italian political party